Oisín (often incorrectly spelled Oisin) is a 1970 Irish short documentary film directed by Patrick Carey. 

The short film, made by the Department of Land as a contribution to European Conservation Year 1970, shows the rhythms of Ireland's natural beauty.

At the 43rd Academy Awards, it was nominated for Best Documentary Short.

References

External links
Oisín at the Irish Film Archive

1970 films
1970s short documentary films
Irish short documentary films
1970s English-language films